Lovelock's theorem of general relativity says that from a local gravitational action which contains only second derivatives of the four-dimensional spacetime metric, then the only possible equations of motion are the Einstein field equations.  The theorem was described by British physicist David Lovelock in 1971.

Statement
In four dimensional spacetime, any tensor  whose components  are functions of the metric tensor  and its first and second derivatives (but linear in the second derivatives of ), and also symmetric and divergence-free,  
is necessarily of the form
 

The only possible second-order Euler–Lagrange expression obtainable in a four-dimensional space from a scalar density of the form  is

Consequences
Lovelock's theorem means that if we want to modify the Einstein field equations, then we have five options.

 Add other fields rather than the metric tensor;
 Use more or fewer than four spacetime dimensions;
 Add more than second order derivatives of the metric;
 Non-locality, e.g. for example the inverse d'Alembertian;
 Emergence – the idea that the field equations don't come from the action.

See also

 Lovelock theory of gravity
 Vermeil's theorem

References

General relativity
Theorems in general relativity